In enzymology, a L-rhamnose isomerase is an enzyme that catalyzes the chemical reaction

L-rhamnose  L-rhamnulose

Hence, this enzyme has one substrate, L-rhamnose, and one product, L-rhamnulose.

This enzyme belongs to the family of isomerases, specifically those intramolecular oxidoreductases interconverting aldoses and ketoses.  The systematic name of this enzyme class is L-rhamnose aldose-ketose-isomerase. Other names in common use include rhamnose isomerase, and L-rhamnose ketol-isomerase.  This enzyme participates in fructose and mannose metabolism.

Structural studies

References

 

EC 5.3.1
Enzymes of known structure